Marine Drive may refer to:

Roads

Bangladesh 
 Cox Bazar-Tekhnaf Marine Drive, world's longest marine drive road.

Canada
Marine Drive (Nova Scotia), a scenic route in Nova Scotia
Marine Drive (Greater Vancouver), a number of roadways in Metropolitan Vancouver

India
Marine Drive, Mumbai, a major boulevard in South Mumbai in the city of Mumbai 
Marine Drive, Kochi, a promenade in Kochi

United Kingdom
Marine Drive (Llandudno), a road around the Great Orme headland in Llandudno, Wales
Marine Drive (Scarborough), a section of seafront road in Scarborough, England

United States
 Marine Drive, the former name of Guam Highway 1

Films
Marine Drive (film), a 1955 Bollywood film directed by G. P. Sippy

See also
Marine Drive Station, a rapid transit station in Vancouver
North Marine Drive, 1983 Ben Watt album and its title track
Saildrive, a form of engine installation for sailing yachts